Hydrogenibacillus  is a thermophilic and facultatively chemolithoautotrophic genus of bacteria from the family of Bacillaceae with one known species (Hydrogenibacillus schlegelii). Bacillus schlegelii was  transferred to Hydrogenibacillus schlegelii

References

Bacillaceae
Bacteria genera
Monotypic bacteria genera